The Hotel Metropole Monte-Carlo, is a five-star hotel at 4, Avenue De La Madone, Monte Carlo, Monaco.

History

The Hotel Metropole was built in 1889, designed by Hans-Georg Tersling. Prince Andrew of Greece and Denmark died there in 1944. Italian-American television host Mike Bongiorno died there in 2009.

Lebanese developer Nabil Boustany bought the hotel from the British Grand Metropolitan group in 1980. Boustany spent $140 million gutting and rebuilding the aging hotel into a modern luxury hotel. The hotel reopened in 1988 as Le Metropole Palace. The opening was attended by Prince Rainier, Prince Albert and Princess Stephanie. The hotel was operated by Conrad Hotels, the international division of Hilton Hotels. In September 2003, the hotel closed for a major renovation, reopening in July 2004 with its name shortened to Hotel Metropole Monte-Carlo to match the original hotel. It has 126 guest rooms, including 64 suites.

In November 2020, the hotel closed for the first phase of renovation; it took five months and the hotel reopened in April 2021.

References

External links

Hotel buildings completed in 1988
Hotels in Monaco
Monte Carlo